is a subway station on the Fukuoka City Subway Hakozaki Line in Higashi-ku, Fukuoka, Japan. Kyūdai-mae means "in front of Kyushu University". Its station symbol is a pine branch with leaves which branch look like Kyushu University's initials Chinese character , because  a pine‐covered area is named Ciyono-matsubara is near this station.

Lines
Hakozaki-Kyūdai-mae Station is served by the Fukuoka City Subway Hakozaki Line.

Platforms

History
The station opened on January 31, 1986.

Surrounding area
 Kyushu University
 Hakozaki Station, on the Kagoshima Main Line

External links
 Fukuoka City Subway station information

Railway stations in Japan opened in 1986
Railway stations in Fukuoka Prefecture
Hakozaki Line